Paraptila pseudogamma is a species of moth of the family Tortricidae. It is found in El Salvador.

Description 
The length of the forewings is 6 mm for males and 8.5 mm for females. The ground colour of the forewings is dark brown with scattered red-copper scales in the basal area, followed by a slate-grey area with dark brown striae. There is a silver-white patch bordering the costa and a dark brown band bordering the costal patch basally. The hindwings are whitish yellow with uniform light grey-brown overscaling.

References

Moths described in 1991
Euliini